Zeroman is a Canadian animated television series produced by Amberwood Entertainment that aired on the Canadian cartoon network Teletoon (in English) and on Télétoon (in French). It tells the adventures of incompetent sixty-three-year-old postman Les Mutton (voiced by Leslie Nielsen) who also happens to be the superhero known as Zeroman. As Zeroman, Les fights the crime that plagues Fair City in a similar fashion to Nielsen's Lieutenant Frank Drebin character in the Naked Gun series.

Premise
The Zerosuit grants its wearer invulnerability (although not completely, especially in areas like the solar plexus where the weave is thinner), flight (taking to the air with a cry of "Out, Out and Away!" apparently through a form of super-flatulence), superhuman strength and various other abilities, including shooting sticky glue-like super-mucus out of his nose when his allergies get particularly bad as in the episode "The Humidifier". But, even though the suit grants its user incredible power, the suit is susceptible to anti-static sheets. When affected by them, the suit wearer is incapacitated, handicapped and put through immense pain as the suit begins to bulge uncontrollably.

Most of the characters are actually modeled after their voice actors. Les/Zeroman, Ty, Rusty, Don and Ron all share many resemblances to their real-life counterparts (Reynolds, who voiced Ty, used to have a moustache).

Characters
Les Mutton/Zeroman: Played by Leslie Nielsen, Les comes into the possession of an alien supersuit that grants the wearer superpowers, turning him into Fair City's hero, Zeroman. When not fighting crime as the Man of Zeal, Les Mutton is an absent-minded and mild-mannered postman who still lives with his mother at the age of sixty-three (he'll be sixty-four in three weeks). Zeroman maintains his secret identity similar to Superman but in reverse, whereas Les doesn't wear glasses and Zeroman does (the Zero-Specs are also a highly advanced communication system that allows him to keep in constant contact with Ty). Even though it's quite obvious that the two are the same person, the people of Fair City (with the exception of Ty and Gary) cannot seem to tell the difference and would even go as far as telling Les otherwise whenever his cover would be blown. This is obviously a fun jab at how Superman hides his secret identity of Clark Kent. Zeroman's secret hideout is located under his mother's shabby suburban house. The main secret entrance is via the toilet in his washroom, and when activated by jiggling the handle and allowing the seat to scan his bum print, it sends Les down the Poop-Chute through a network of tunnels to the caverns of his base. While not explained in detail, Les' father was a secret agent complete with Sean Connery accent (the Zero-Specs were originally one of his spy gadgets). Les has romantic feelings for his co-worker, Sally, but can never really express them to her and seems unaware that she actually reciprocates them.  Les is quite neurotic and not very bright with a tendency to misunderstand just about everything that is said to him, and his natural clumsiness, augmented by his cheerful obliviousness, is magnified to incredible proportions by the suit, but he is brave and good-hearted and is dedicated to fighting the forces of evil. He also has a strong love of his mother and goes into fetal position muttering "Mommy, mommy, mommy" when she gets kidnapped (Referred as "Mommy go bye-bye syndrome" by Ty).

Jaundice Mutton (Les Mutton's Mother): Jaundice Mutton simply wants her son to finally move out of the house and get married. She is a cruel and bitter old woman who is constantly annoyed at her inept son. Jaundice is also Zeroman's #1 fan, where the irony comes in as she simply loathes her son but is head over heels for his alter-ego, in the episode "Smotherly Love" taking the hero hostage like in the Stephen King novel/movie Misery. Although publicity material states that Les' mother is played by Doris Roberts, the character does not sound like her nor is her name listed in the voice credits.

Ty Cheese: Ty Cheese is a former secret agent who aids Zeroman in his fight against the evil-doers of Fair City. Ty provides Zeroman with technological and intelligence support as well as giving the inept hero the constant guidance and advice he so desperately needs because, as he says, "Ty is always right". He is implicitly homosexual, something  which has been shown many times during the series as in Sally's cat fight with the super-sexy robot assassin Ann Droid in the episode "Artificial Intolerance" which simply resulted in the response of "It doesn't do anything for me" from Ty, and in the episode "Supersuit and Ty Required" where Zeroman decides to find a successor and rejects the notion of Ty being his heir, with Ty initially thinking that it is because of his sexuality, but at the end Les reveals it was because Zeroman wouldn't be Zeroman without Ty there to always help him. Ty was briefly the feline superhero Hellcat with Gary as his bovine sidekick Holy Cow when Zeroman was out of town at a hero convention in the episode "Peace Off". Ty is played by Ryan Reynolds.

Sally Uberchick: Sally is Les' much younger co-worker and love interest. She has strong feelings for Les and is always waiting for him to make a move, but he never does because he is always called to action during their moments together. Sally is also known to be Zeroman's "main squeeze" by the people of Fair City, even though she constantly denies it as there is truly nothing going on between them. This gossip, of course, puts her in danger many times.

Gary Glengarry/O-Boy: Gary as O-Boy is Zeroman's obnoxious but loyal when the chips are down ten-year-old sidekick-in-training, constantly getting into arguments with Ty over the matter and other general things relating to their mission and willing to use any means necessary, including sabotage, to get his chance to be an actual full-fledged superhero. An orphan who, despite his ambition, looks upon Zeroman as the father figure he never had, Gary is a boy millionaire who provides the financial backing for the team as well as a host of gadgets and other advanced technology that never seems to work properly.

Rusty Woodenwater: Rusty Woodenwater is a former child star turned criminal mastermind. Rusty was once the most loved television personality of Fair City until he entered puberty. During that life and career changing moment, he had his first acne outbreak on-air during his show, which resulted in the eventual cancellation of his show and the decline of his career, ending when he was booed off his show. After falling from grace, Rusty went from being famous to becoming infamous as Fair City's most dangerous supervillain. The Zerosuit was also originally made for Rusty, this of course resulted in many attempts at trying to retrieve it from Zeroman which always ended up in failure. Even though he is an evil genius and criminal mastermind, Rusty on occasion throws fits and tantrums, and he has his henchmen Don and Ron do his dirty work due to basically being ineffectual as a villain. And like his nemesis Zeroman, he also has a poor relationship with his mother, albeit Rusty's is far worse as his mother actually renounces Rusty as her son. Rusty's most distinguishing characteristics are his mullet-cut red hair and his annoyingly shrill voice. Kevin McDonald provides the voice of Rusty.

Don: Don is Rusty's former manager turned henchman, he is dressed up as a 1940s style gangster, with a tough, no-nonsense attitude and the catchphrase "Ba-wango!". He is modeled after former NHL coach and hockey personality Don Cherry who also provides the voice for him.

Ron: Ron is Rusty's former publicist turned henchman, in dress and deportment quite the opposite of his curmudgeonly counterpart Don, often serving as a whipping boy for his ill-tempered companions. Like Don, Ron is modeled after and voiced by hockey personality Ron MacLean. Don and Ron have similar interactions to their real-life counterparts on the Coach's Corner segment of Hockey Night in Canada.

Mayor Todd MacWadd: He is the friendly and naive mayor of Fair City who issues the order to summon Zeroman when needed via a catapult on top of City Hall which launches the "Great Flaming Holes!" (huge truck tires which have been set on fire) off into the sky in random directions, usually causing damage to property throughout the surrounding city when they crash to the ground. He resembles the character Jay Sherman from The Critic as well as the actor who plays Jay Sherman, Jon Lovitz.

Helga: Helga is the corrupt police chief of Fair City who is in love with Rusty, giving him aid and comfort with his criminal schemes. She is a large woman with a Russian accent.

Cast
Leslie Nielsen as Les Mutton/Zeroman
Ryan Reynolds as Ty Cheese
Don Cherry as Don
Ron MacLean as Ron
Kevin McDonald as Rusty Woodenwater
Chantal Quesnel as Sally Uberchick, Ann Droid
Kate Hurman as Jaundice Mutton (Les Muttons mother), Chief Helga
Norman Mikeal Berketa as Mayor MacWadd, Bucky Dentyne, Various
David L. McCallum as Reverend Loveglove, Dirk Dinkle, Various
James Watts as Gary Glengarry/O Boy
J.D. Wilson as Various

Episodes

A total of 13 episodes were produced. Although a second season was once announced as in production, the death of Leslie Nielsen would appear to make it unlikely. The complete series was released on DVD in North America on June 2, 2009.

 Crack of Doom: written by J.D. Smith
 Smotherly Love: written by David Finley
 Hamsassin: written by Dale Schott
 Super Suit and Ty Required: written by J.D. Smith
 Artificial Intolerance: written by David Finley
 Mutton In Common: written by Peter Sauder
 Peace Off: written by Simon Racioppa, Richard Elliott, and J.D. Smith
 Son of Zeroman: written by J.D. Smith
 The Hummidifier: written by David Finley
 Z-Man of Alcatruss: written by David Finley
 Disorder in the Court: written by Peter Sauder
 Alpha Beta VH Les: written by Jonathan Wiseman, Chris Roy, and Andrew King
 Les Than Zero: written by Peter Sauder

References

External links
 

Teletoon original programming
2000s Canadian animated television series
2004 Canadian television series debuts
2004 Canadian television series endings
Canadian children's animated action television series
Canadian children's animated adventure television series
Canadian children's animated comedy television series
Canadian children's animated superhero television series
Canadian superhero comedy television series
Amberwood Entertainment
English-language television shows